Black Mor's Island is a 2004 French animated adventure film directed by Jean-François Laguionie. Set in 1803, it follows a 15-year-old boy who sets out to find a buried pirate treasure. The film was released in France on 11 February 2004.

Cast
 Taric Mehani as the Kid
  as the Little Monch
 Jean-Paul Roussillon as Mac Gregor
  as La Ficelle
 Yanecko Romba as Master Forbes
  as the Director

Reception
Variety's Lisa Nesselson wrote: "Handsome visuals and an especially classy instrumental score make this a quality adventure for kids, with enough narrative drive to keep adults engaged."

References

Fiction set in 1803
2000s adventure films
2004 animated films
2004 films
Films directed by Jean-François Laguionie
Films set in the 1800s
2000s French animated films
French adventure films
French animated films
French children's films
2000s French-language films
Treasure hunt films
2000s French films